In 1901, in Camden, New Jersey, the Automobile and Marine Power Company decided to move from just producing engines to building whole cars. The New Era was basic, with the engine underneath the seat, tiller steering, and a side crank. Base price was $700, but with options the price was raised to $850.  The New Era ceased production in 1902.

References

Defunct motor vehicle manufacturers of the United States
Defunct manufacturing companies based in New Jersey
Companies based in Camden, New Jersey
Companies established in 1901
Companies disestablished in 1902
Veteran vehicles
1900s cars
Motor vehicle manufacturers based in New Jersey
Vehicle manufacturing companies established in 1901
Vehicle manufacturing companies disestablished in 1902
Cars introduced in 1901